Howard O'Neal Carter (born October 26, 1961) is a retired American-French professional basketball player. He played college basketball for Louisiana State University (LSU) before being drafted 15th overall by the Denver Nuggets in the 1983 NBA draft.

College career
Howard "Hi-C" Carter played basketball for the LSU Tigers from 1980 to 1983, and played in the 1981 Final Four. While at LSU, Carter was named Second Team All-American in 1982 and in 1983.

Professional career
Howard was selected 15th overall out of Louisiana State University in the 1983 NBA Draft by the Denver Nuggets, with whom he played only one season, averaging 6.2 points.

His brief NBA career ended with the Dallas Mavericks in 1984–85. He then went on to play nearly a decade in France, eventually taking out French citizenship and playing on the France national team. Carter finished his playing career in Greece.

Personal life
The youngest of his four children, Cameron Carter-Vickers, is currently a professional football player for Scottish club Celtic F.C. He also represents the United States internationally.

References

External links
College & NBA stats

1961 births
Living people
African-American basketball players
American expatriate basketball people in France
American expatriate basketball people in Greece
American men's basketball players
Basketball players from Baton Rouge, Louisiana
Dallas Mavericks players
Denver Nuggets draft picks
Denver Nuggets players
Élan Béarnais players
French people of African-American descent
French men's basketball players
Irakleio B.C. players
LSU Tigers basketball players
Montpellier Paillade Basket players
Parade High School All-Americans (boys' basketball)
Philippine Basketball Association imports
Shooting guards
Shell Turbo Chargers players
American expatriate basketball people in the Philippines
21st-century African-American people
20th-century African-American sportspeople